TKL may refer to:

 Teck Lee LRT station (LRT station abbreviation), Punggol, Singapore
 Tokelau, an island country in the South Pacific Ocean
 The Kid Laroi (born 2003), Australian singer, songwriter and rapper
 The Kids League, a non-profit NGO registered in Uganda
 TurnKey Linux Virtual Appliance Library, an open source project that provides pre-packaged server software appliances
 Tiu Keng Leng, south west part of the Tseung Kwan O New Town in Hong Kong.